The 1984–85 Boise State Broncos men's basketball team represented Boise State University during the 1984–85 NCAA Division I men's basketball season. The Broncos were led by second-year head coach Bobby Dye and played their home games on campus at the BSU Pavilion in Boise, Idaho.

In the semifinal, Boise State lost by three points to sixth-seeded 

This was the tenth year of the Big Sky tourney, and the first time that BSU had hosted; the first eight editions were four-team events, hosted by the regular season champion. The Broncos won the first in 1976.

Postseason results

|-
!colspan=6 style=| Big Sky tournament

References

External links
Sports Reference – Boise State Broncos – 1984–85 basketball season

Boise State Broncos men's basketball seasons
Boise State
Boise State